Eva Byszio (born 25 May 1993) is a German ice hockey player for ERC Ingolstadt and the German national team. She participated at the 2015 IIHF Women's World Championship.

References

1993 births
Living people
German women's ice hockey forwards